Group E of the 2019 FIBA Basketball World Cup was the group stage of the 2019 FIBA Basketball World Cup for the , ,  and . Each team played each other once, for a total of three games per team, with all games played at Shanghai Oriental Sports Center, Shanghai. After all of the games were played, the top two teams with the best records qualified for the Second round and the bottom two teams played in the Classification Round.

Teams

Standings

Games
All times are local (UTC+8).

Turkey vs. Japan
This was the first competitive game between Turkey and Japan.

Czech Republic vs. United States
This was the first competitive game between the Czech Republic and the United States.

Japan vs. Czech Republic
This was the first competitive game between Japan and the Czech Republic.

United States vs. Turkey
This was the third game between the United States and Turkey, with the Americans winning the prior two games, including in 2014, which was the last competitive game between the two teams.

Turkey vs. Czech Republic
This was the first game between Turkey and the Czech Republic in the World Cup. The Turks won in EuroBasket 2007, which was the last competitive game between the two teams.

United States vs. Japan
This was the first game between the United States and Japan in the World Cup. The Americans won in the 1972 Olympics, which was the last competitive game between the two teams.

References

External links

2019 FIBA Basketball World Cup
2018–19 in American basketball
2018–19 in Turkish basketball
2018–19 in Czech basketball
Group E